Why Freud Was Wrong: Sin, Science and Psychoanalysis (1995; second edition 1996; third edition 2005) is a book by Richard Webster, in which the author provides a critique of Sigmund Freud and psychoanalysis, and attempts to develop his own theory of human nature. Webster argues that Freud became a kind of Messiah and that psychoanalysis is a pseudoscience and a disguised continuation of the Judaeo-Christian tradition. Webster endorses Gilbert Ryle's arguments against mentalist philosophies in The Concept of Mind (1949), and criticizes many other authors for their treatment of Freud and psychoanalysis.

The book for which Webster may be best remembered, it has been called "brilliant" and "definitive", but has also been criticized for shortcomings of scholarship and argument. It formed part of the "Freud wars", an ongoing controversy around psychoanalysis.

Summary
Webster argues that Freud became a kind of Messiah and that psychoanalysis is a pseudoscience and a disguised continuation of the Judaeo-Christian tradition. He describes psychoanalysis as "perhaps the most complex and successful" pseudoscience in history, and Freud as an impostor who sought to found a false religion. However, Webster also writes that, "My ultimate goal is not to humiliate Freud or to inflict mortal injury either on him or his followers. It is to interpret and illuminate his beliefs and his personality in order that we may better understand our own culture, our own history, and indeed, our own psychology. It is to this constructive attempt to analyse the nature and sources of Freud's mistakes that my title primarily refers." He discusses the influence on Freud of the otolaryngologist Wilhelm Fliess and the biologist Ernst Haeckel.

Webster writes that while Ernest Jones wrote The Life and Work of Sigmund Freud (1953-1957) with the avowed objective of correcting a "mendacious legend" about Freud, Jones replaced that negative with a positive legend. Webster maintains that Jones, "did not hesitate to retouch reality wherever it seemed to conflict with the portrait which he sought to create." Webster argues that while Peter Gay's Freud: A Life for Our Time (1988) is presented as an objective exercise in historical scholarship, and considers the failings of psychoanalysis and Freud's mistakes, Gay nonetheless retains a reverent attitude toward Freud, preserving the myths about him created by previous biographers. Webster called these myths the "Freud legend". He suggests that the acclaim the book received shows the persistence of the Freud legend, noting that with exceptions such as Peter Swales, many reviewers praised it, especially in Britain. He saw its appeal to supporters of psychoanalysis as being its favorable view of Freudian ideas.

He endorses Gilbert Ryle's arguments against mentalist philosophies in The Concept of Mind (1949), suggesting that they imply that "theories of human nature which repudiate the evidence of behaviour and refer solely or primarily to invisible mental events will never in themselves be able to unlock the most significant mysteries of human nature." Webster writes that the philosopher Adolf Grünbaum's The Foundations of Psychoanalysis (1984) has been criticized by Frank Cioffi, who rejects Grünbaum's portrayal of Freud as a philosophically astute investigator of human psychology. Webster argues that while the book contains much pertinent criticism of Freud, it has been overvalued by critics of psychoanalysis because of its overly theoretical and abstract style of argument, and has also distracted attention away from issues such as Freud's character. Webster compared the former psychoanalyst Jeffrey Moussaieff Masson's The Assault on Truth (1984) to E. M. Thornton's The Freudian Fallacy (1983), finding both authors hostile towards Freud and psychoanalysis. However, he suggested that Masson nevertheless retained a partly positive view of Freud. Webster credited Masson with making some contributions to the history of psychoanalysis, but wrote that his central argument has not convinced either the psychoanalytic establishment or the majority of Freud's critics, as Masson accepted that Freud formulated the seduction theory on the basis of memories of childhood seduction provided by his patients, an account disputed by scholars such as Cioffi, Thornton, Han Israëls, and Morton Schatzman, who have argued that Freud's original account of his therapeutic methods suggests that this is not what occurred. According to Webster, Freud's seduction theory maintained that episodes of childhood seduction would have a pathological effect only if the victim had no conscious recollection of them, and the purpose of his therapeutic sessions was not to listen to freely offered recollections but to encourage his patients to discover or construct scenes of which they had no recollection. Webster blamed Masson for encouraging the spread of the recovered memory movement by implying that most or all serious cases of neurosis are caused by child sexual abuse, that orthodox psychoanalysts were collectively engaged in a massive denial of this fact, and that an equally massive collective effort to retrieve painful memories of incest was required. Webster describes the critic Frederick Crews's The Memory Wars (1995) as one of the most significant contributions to the debate on recovered memory therapy. Webster writes that the psychologist Hans Eysenck's Decline and Fall of the Freudian Empire (1985) contains many cogent criticisms of Freud, but criticizes Eysenck for uncritically accepting Elizabeth Thornton's argument that Joseph Breuer's patient Anna O. suffered from tuberculous meningitis. Webster writes that some of Thomas Szasz's arguments in The Myth of Mental Illness (1961) are similar to his, but that he disagrees with his view that hysteria was an emotional problem and that Jean-Martin Charcot's patients were not genuinely mentally ill. Webster concludes that no "negative critique" of psychoanalysis "can ever constitute an adequate refutation" of Freud's theories, because "bad theories can only be driven out by better theories."

Publication history

Why Freud Was Wrong was first published in 1995 by HarperCollins. In 1996, an edition with an added preface was published. In 2005, an edition with a new postscript was published by The Orwell Press. The work has been translated into French, Spanish, Portuguese, Russian and Hungarian.

Reception

Media commentary
Why Freud Was Wrong received positive reviews from Genevieve Stuttaford in Publishers Weekly, the psychiatrist E. Fuller Torrey in National Review, and the critic David Lodge in Commonweal, a mixed review from Dennis G. Twiggs in Library Journal, and a negative review from the historian Frank McLynn in New Statesman & Society. The book was also reviewed by Brenda Grazis in Booklist, the biographer Paul Ferris in The Spectator, the psychologist Stuart Sutherland in The Times Higher Education Supplement, R. H. Balsam in Choice, the psychiatrist Bob Johnson in New Scientist, Kate Chisholm in TES, Sarah Boxer in The New York Times Book Review, and discussed by the journalist Bob Woffinden in The Guardian.

Stuttaford described the book as "a formidable critique of Freud's theories and modern psychoanalytic practice". Torrey called the book "scholarly and substantive". He suggested that Webster was well suited to the task of discussing the Christian roots of Freud's ideas and credited him with providing a detailed discussion of Freud's character that revealed its "unpleasant traits", though he considered his comment that Freud had a "sometimes less than scrupulous attitude toward truth" as an understatement. He found his discussion of the recovered memory movement one of the most interesting sections of the book. However, he criticized him for not providing more discussion of the cultural influence of Freudian theories, for failing to address "Freud's misogynistic teachings" and their effects on the women's movement, and for providing insufficient information about Freud's use of cocaine.

Lodge considered the book "exceptionally searching, lucid, and well-argued", as well as "intellectually exciting" and "challenging", and noted that it was "linked to an ambitious project for a true science of human nature". He wrote that it was impossible to read it "without having one's respect for Freud shaken and diminished". However, he added that it was possible to "learn from it without accepting Webster's thesis that Freud's ideas were totally worthless." He accepted Webster's argument that the growth of the psychoanalytic movement corresponds closely to the historical development of religions, but wrote that this does not necessarily discredit psychoanalysis.

Twiggs described the book as readable, and wrote that it presented an effective argument and rivaled the psychiatrist Henri Ellenberger's The Discovery of the Unconscious (1970). However, he criticized Webster for failing to address the point that psychoanalysis added a "critical dimension to a growing theory of human behavior and spirituality".

McLynn described the work as "the oddest book to come my way in years". He wrote that Webster made "the most savage attack ever mounted on Freud and psychoanalysis", and offered a confused and eclectic attempt to develop a general theory of human nature. In his view, the book failed to live up to the "grandiose claims" made by its publishers. He criticized Webster for maintaining that mental illness is misdiagnosed organic disease, for criticizing physicians and psychiatrists despite his lack of medical qualifications, for offering conjectural explanations of cases of hysteria and schizophrenia, for unreasonably insisting "that Freud should have acquainted us ... with every stage in his work with patients", and for misunderstanding psychoanalysis. He found Webster's criticisms of concepts such as "unconscious rage" unconvincing, accused him of "internal inconsistencies", and wrote that he "has a disconcerting habit of citing anti-Freudian authorities to bolster an argument and then rounding on them to claim that the rest of their anti-Freudian argument is false."

Woffinden suggested that Why Freud Was Wrong may be the book for which Webster is best remembered.

Reviews in scientific and academic journals
Why Freud Was Wrong received a positive review in the Journal of the History of the Behavioral Sciences, a mixed review from Peter Swales in Nature, and a negative review from Hannah S. Decker in Isis. The book was also reviewed by John S. Callender in BMJ, the psychoanalyst John Lawrence in the Journal of Social Work Practice, and the evolutionary biologist George C. Williams in The Quarterly Review of Biology.

The Journal of the History of the Behavioral Sciences described the book as a "a valuable contribution" to understanding Freud and credited Webster with "a thorough study of Freud’s life and works as well as of secondary sources".

Swales wrote that while the book was advertised on its jacket as a comprehensive biography, Webster did not expand "factual knowledge of Freud's life and work", but rather engaged in a "relentless polemic" that was "flawed in its simplifications" but "lethal in its total impact." He considered the book an important contribution despite being largely derivative. He considered Webster's evaluation of Freud as a person "provocative though tenable". He noted that Webster, despite not having a background in medicine, argued that Breuer's patient Anna O. suffered from "a severe neurological disorder" and that "its array of florid symptoms underwent spontaneous remission one after another." He credited Webster with exposing many "empirical and logical" absurdities in Freud's views, and making a generally strong case against Freud. However, he was less convinced by Webster's attempt to minimize Freud's originality, finding it "wearisome". He argued that Webster lacked familiarity with the history of ideas in 19th-century Germany and Austria and was too "Anglo-centric" in his approach, and criticized him for devoting only half a page to Freud's most intellectually formative years, and ignoring published letters by Freud written during that period. He considered Webster, following Frank Sulloway, correct to emphasize that the development of Freud's theories after 1896 was mainly inspired by assumptions drawn from contemporary biology. However, he maintained that Webster was "oblivious to Freud's background in biology" and wrongly concluded that it was Fliess, rather than Haeckel, who led Freud to accept the view that ontogeny recapitulates phylogeny. He criticized Webster for failing to consider sources of Freudian theory such as Thomas Carlyle. He considered Webster's efforts to create a "new psychology", based on neo-Darwinism, unconvincing and wrote that Webster failed to explain what it would consist of.

Decker wrote that Webster showed "a commendable command of the secondary literature", but described his book as "a work of total nihilism" and wrote that it contained "many factual errors" and was difficult to take seriously. Decker accepted that some of Webster's objections to Freud "had some substance", but in her view he destroyed the validity of these points by taking them to extremes. She gave as an example the way Webster moved from correctly noting that Freud "did hound some of his patients to give him the evidence he was looking for", to incorrectly concluding that all of his patients' accounts of seductions and fantasies were Freud's reconstructions, thereby undermining a sound observation. She agreed with Webster that not all dreams are wish fulfillments, but criticized him for not acknowledging that psychoanalysts have long abandoned the belief that they are. She considered Webster naive or ignorant to deny that "emotions can produce bodily phenomena", and criticized his discussion of Breuer's treatment of his patient Anna O.

Other evaluations
Why Freud Was Wrong was described as "brilliant" by the psychiatrist Anthony Storr and the biographer Jonathan Gathorne-Hardy, and "definitive" by the philosopher Raymond Tallis, but was criticized for shortcomings of scholarship and argument by the critic Elaine Showalter. In a preface to the 1998 edition of The Assault on Truth, first published in 1984, Masson wrote that Why Freud Was Wrong had received acclaim. However, he criticized Webster for blaming him for the current interest in recovered memories, writing that his interest in writing The Assault on Truth had nothing to do with the recovery of memories, and that he did not discuss the topic in any depth. Masson argued that Webster was incorrect to claim that there is no evidence that any of Freud's patients had been sexually abused. He also criticized Webster's views on recovered memory, writing that they ignored relevant evidence. The psychologist Louis Breger saw some of Webster's points as valuable, but concluded that Webster, like some other critics of Freud, too frequently jumps "from valid criticisms of some part of Freud's work to a condemnation of the whole." The philosopher Mikkel Borch-Jacobsen and the psychologist Sonu Shamdasani wrote that Why Freud Was Wrong was made possible by new scholarship on Freud, and formed part of the "Freud Wars", an ongoing controversy around psychoanalysis.

References

Notes

Bibliography

Books

Journals

Online articles

 
 

1995 non-fiction books
Books about Sigmund Freud
Books by Richard Webster (British author)
English-language books
English non-fiction books
HarperCollins books
Orwell Press books